G minor is a minor scale based on G, consisting of the pitches G, A, B, C, D, E, and F. Its key signature has two flats. Its relative major is B-flat major and its parallel major is G major.

The G natural minor scale is:

Changes needed for the melodic and harmonic versions of the scale are written in with accidentals as necessary. The G harmonic minor and melodic minor scales are:

Mozart's use of G minor

G minor has been considered the key through which Wolfgang Amadeus Mozart best expressed sadness and tragedy, and many of his minor key works are in G minor, such as Piano Quartet No. 1 and String Quintet No. 4. Though Mozart touched on various minor keys in his symphonies, G minor is the only minor key he used as a main key for his numbered symphonies (No. 25, and the famous No. 40). In the Classical period, symphonies in G minor almost always used four horns, two in G and two in B alto. Another convention of G minor symphonies observed in Mozart's No. 25 and Mozart's No. 40 was the choice of E-flat major, the subdominant of the relative major B, for the slow movement, with other examples including Joseph Haydn's No. 39 and Johann Baptist Wanhal's G minor symphony from before 1771.

Notable works in G minor

 Arcangelo Corelli
 Christmas Concerto
 Henry Purcell
 "Dido's Lament" from Dido and Aeneas
 Antonio Vivaldi
"Summer" from The Four Seasons
 Johann Sebastian Bach
 Sonata No. 1 in G minor, BWV 1001
 Great Fantasia and Fugue in G minor, BWV 542
 "Little" Fugue in G minor, BWV 578
 Joseph Haydn
 Symphony No. 83 "The Hen"
 Charles-Valentin Alkan
 Scherzo diabolico, Op. 39, No. 3
 49 Esquisses, Op. 63, no. 6 "Les cloches"; no. 26 "Petit air, Genre ancien"
 Wolfgang Amadeus Mozart
 Symphony No. 25
 Symphony No. 40
 Felix Mendelssohn
 Piano Concerto No. 1
 Frédéric Chopin
 Ballade No. 1
 Nocturne Op. 37, No. 1
 Prelude Op. 28, No. 22 "Impatience"
 Cello Sonata, Op. 65
 Polonaise in G minor Op. posth.
 Franz Liszt
 Transcendental Étude No. 6 "Vision"
 Johannes Brahms
 Hungarian Dance No. 5 (orchestral version)
 Camille Saint-Saëns
 Piano Concerto No. 2
 Max Bruch
 Violin Concerto No. 1, Op. 26
 Pyotr Ilyich Tchaikovsky
 Symphony No. 1, Op. 13
 Antonín Dvořák
 Slavonic Dance No. 8
 Gabriel Fauré
 Sicilienne, Op. 78
 Claude Debussy
 String Quartet, Op. 10
 Isaac Albéniz
 Cataluña
 Ralph Vaughan Williams
 Mass in G minor
 Sergei Rachmaninoff
 Piano Concerto No. 4
 Prelude in G minor
 Cello Sonata
 Sergei Prokofiev
 Piano Concerto No. 2, Op. 16

See also
Key (music)
Major and minor

References

External links

Musical keys
Minor scales